Marcos Paulo dos Santos or simply known as Marko dos Santos (born 18 May 1981) is a Brazilian footballer who plays as a winger.

He came to Albania on 24 January 2003 when he signed for Apollonia coming from Sparta Futebol Clube from Minas Gerais.

Besa Kavajë
Dos Santos made his debut for Besa against Olympiacos F.C. in Tirana in the UEFA Europa League. He played as a striker having very good performance, although his team lost 5-0.

References

External links
Profile at EPAE.org

1981 births
Living people
Brazilian footballers
Association football midfielders
Association football forwards
Kategoria Superiore players
Cypriot First Division players
KF Skënderbeu Korçë players
KS Gramozi Ersekë players
KF Apolonia Fier players
Besa Kavajë players
Ayia Napa FC players
Brazilian expatriate footballers
Brazilian expatriate sportspeople in Albania
Expatriate footballers in Albania
Expatriate footballers in Greece
Expatriate footballers in Cyprus